The 1924 VPI Gobblers football team represented Virginia Polytechnic Institute in the 1924 college football season.  The team was led by their head coach B. C. Cubbage and finished with a record of four wins, two losses and three ties (4–2–3).

Schedule

Players
The following players were members of the 1924 football team according to the roster published in the 1925 edition of The Bugle, the Virginia Tech yearbook.

References

VPI
Virginia Tech Hokies football seasons
VPI Gobblers football